Gracixalus gracilipes, commonly known as the Chapa bubble-nest frog, black eye-lidded small tree frog, yellow and black-spotted tree frog or slender-legged bush frog, is a species of shrub frog from northern Vietnam, southern China (Yunnan, Guangxi, Guangdong), and northwestern Thailand (and, presumably, also in adjacent Myanmar).

It inhabits evergreen and bamboo forests. The eggs are deposited on leaves overhanging temporary forest pools; upon hatching, the tadpoles drop into the water where their development continues.

References

gracilipes
Frogs of China
Amphibians of Thailand
Amphibians of Vietnam
Amphibians described in 1937
Taxa named by René Léon Bourret